It Should've Happened a Long Time Ago is an album by Paul Motian on the ECM label. It was released in 1985 and features performances by Motian with guitarist Bill Frisell and tenor saxophonist Joe Lovano, the first album to feature them in a trio following three albums where they formed the basis of Motian's quintet (Jack of Clubs, The Story of Maryam and Psalm).

Reception
The Allmusic review by Thom Jurek awarded the album 4½ stars, stating: "This is one of the finest recordings that came from ECM in the '80s. Paul Bley led another, which featured Motian and Frisell -- as well as John Surman. This set is made of the kind of music that made Manfred Eicher's ECM such a force to be reckoned with. It placed three musicians in a context that was comfortable enough to make them want to sing to one another."

Track listing
 "It Should've Happened a Long Time Ago" - 6:06  
 "Fiasco" - 7:49  
 "Conception Vessel" - 4:31  
 "Introduction" - 3:05  
 "India" - 7:26  
 "In the Year of the Dragon" - 5:56
 "Two Women from Padua" - 5:13
All compositions by Paul Motian

Personnel
Paul Motian - drums
Bill Frisell - guitar
Joe Lovano - tenor saxophone

References 

1985 albums
Paul Motian albums
ECM Records albums